Singles is a compilation album of previously unreleased songs and B-sides by Jimmy Eat World. After being planned for release in July 2000, it was eventually released on August 8, 2000. After leaving Capitol Records, the compilation was released as a means of self-funding the recording sessions for their next album Bleed American.

Artwork
The photo of a marquee featured prominently on the cover was taken at the Fox Theatre in Boulder, Colorado. It also features a photo of the Capitol Records Building in Hollywood, the headquarters of the band's former label.

Track listing

All songs written by Jimmy Eat World except Track 5 written by The Wedding Present. The band also intended to include their cover of Duran Duran's song "New Religion", which originally appeared on a tribute album, but were denied permission by the record label that originally released it. Jim Adkins' original liner notes refer to the song "Better Than Oh" (from the Jimmy Eat World / Emery split 7-inch), but it is not included on the U.S. release.

Additional versions

Personnel
Jim Adkins – guitar,  lead vocals (3–5, 8, 9, 11), co-lead vocals (6)
Rick Burch – bass
Zach Lind – drums
Tom Linton – guitar, lead vocals (1, 2, 10), co-lead vocals (6)
 Various tracks engineered by John Agnello, Larry Elyea, Mark Trombino and Steve Revitte

References

Jimmy Eat World compilation albums
2000 compilation albums
Big Wheel Recreation compilation albums
Defiance Records albums